The Worse Things Get, the Harder I Fight, the Harder I Fight, the More I Love You is the sixth studio album by American musician Neko Case. It was released on September 3, 2013 under Anti Records. The album was nominated for Best Alternative Music Album at the 56th Annual Grammy Awards.

Track listing

Personnel
Primary musicians
Neko Case – Vocals (1-15), Backing Vocals (1-3,5-7,10,11), Guitar (1,3,5,14), Tambourine (3,8,10), Jingle Bells (10), Percussion (15)
Kelly Hogan – Backing Vocals (1-3,5-7,10)
Jon Rauhouse – Electric Guitar (1,2,5,7,11,12), Pedal Steel Guitar (1,5), Acoustic Guitar (4,8), Banjo (11,14), Trombone (12), Hawaiian Guitar (14)
Paul Rigby – Electric Guitar (1-3,5,7,8,10-12), Acoustic Guitar (1,5,7,8), Twelve String Guitar (10)
Tom V. Ray – bass (1-3,5,7,8,10-12,14)

Additional musicians
Eric Bachmann - Backing Vocals (15)
Steve Berlin – MIDI Saxophone (1,2), Baritone Saxophone (2,5,19,12), Flute (5,11)
Carl Broemel – Electric Guitar Solo (8) and Autoharp (9)
Joey Burns – Cello (2,8,10,12), Baritone Guitar (10), Bass (11)
Tracyanne Campbell – Vocals (6)
John Convertino - Drums (5,7,10-12)
Kurt Dahle – Drums (1-3,5,8,12)
Rachael Flotard – Backing Vocals (1-3,5,6,10)
Howe Gelb - Organ (13), Synth (13)
Tom Hagerman – Violin (10), Viola (10)
Jim James – Backing Vocals (2)
Bo Koster – Piano (1-3,7,8,11,12), Organ (1,5,10,12), Mellotron (1), Bass Organ (1), Synth (2,8,12), Keyboards (3), Melodeon (7), Wurlitzer (7), Clavinet (8), Vibes (9,11)
Tommy Larkin - Drums (13)
Nick Luca - Bass (13), Guitar (13)
Carolyn Mark - Backing Vocals (14)
A. C. Newman – Backing Vocals (2,6,12), Guitar (15)
Marc Ribot – Piano (9)
Craig Schumacher – Chimes (10)
Chris Schultz – Sonar Samples (11)
Steve Turner - Electric Guitar (1,3)
Jacob Valenzuela – Trumpet (7,12)
M. Ward – Electric Guitar (2,3,10), Vocals (13)
Martin Wenk – Trumpet (7,12)

References

2013 albums
Neko Case albums
Anti- (record label) albums
Albums produced by Tucker Martine